Astmal (also Romanized as Astmāl and Āstamāl) is a village in Jushin Rural District, Kharvana District, Varzaqan County, East Azerbaijan Province, Iran. At the 2011 census, its population was 363, in 127 families.

References 

Towns and villages in Varzaqan County